The Sweden Rock Festival is an annual rock/metal festival held in Sweden since 6 June 1992. While having a clear rock/metal focus, the festival is noted for its diversity across these genres, from southern rock bands such as Molly Hatchet to death metal legends like Obituary.

The first version of the festival, known as Sommarfestivalen i Olofström, was held in Olofström in 1992. In 1993 the festival moved to Karlshamn, and changed its name to Karlshamn Rock Festival. In 1998, the festival moved to Norje, although the name Karlshamn Rock Festival was kept. In 1999 the name was changed to the Sweden Rock Festival.

When the festival began in 1992, it featured nine relatively unknown bands and it only lasted one day. The next year the festival was expanded to two days and more bands were added to the line-up. From 1993 to 2002 the festival would last two days; over those years it would also begin to feature bigger name acts. In 2000 the festival was expanded to three days but it returned to two days the following year.

From 2003 to 2006 the festival lasted three days and had by then featured some of the biggest acts in metal and rock. From 2007 the festival has been expanded to four days and will feature approximately 120 different bands/artists.

Some notable appearances in the past have been Aerosmith, Iron Maiden, Judas Priest, Mötley Crüe, Dio, Bruce Dickinson, Yngwie Malmsteen, Twisted Sister, Whitesnake, Uriah Heep, Europe, Deep Purple, Accept, Motörhead, Saxon, Nazareth, Poison, Status Quo, Lynyrd Skynyrd, Scorpions, Porcupine Tree, Kamelot, Def Leppard, Alice Cooper, Testament, W.A.S.P, ZZ Top, The Orchestra, Thin Lizzy, Ted Nugent, Slayer and Guns N' Roses.

The festival has also worked as a comeback scene for bands like Triumph and Thundersteel line-up Riot.

Bachman & Turner started their world reunion tour here in June 2010. In 2013 both Rush and Kiss together with Europe were headliners for the festival.

The COVID-19 pandemic caused the festival to be cancelled in 2020 and 2021.

2023 lineup

2022 lineup

2021 lineup

2020 lineup

2019 lineup

2018 lineup

2017 lineup

2016 lineup

2015 line-up

2014 line-up

2013 line-up

2012 line-up

2011 line-up

2010 line-up

2009 line-up

2008 line-up

2007 line-up

2006 line-up

2005 line-up

2004 line-up

2003 line-up

2002 line-up

2001 line-up

2000 line-up

1999 line-up

1998 line-up

1997 line-up

1996 line-up

1995 line-up

1994 line-up

1993 line-up

1992 line-up

References

External links 

 Sweden Rock Festival – official website
 Pictures from Sweden Rock Festival since 2001
 Sweden Rock Festival – Russian website, руcскоязычный сайт о фестивале
– TheClosedCircle for Sweden Rock 2015

Heavy metal festivals in Sweden
Rock festivals in Sweden
Music festivals established in 1992
Summer events in Sweden
June events